Internationalist Struggle (LI) is a Trotskyist organisation in Spain. It is part of the International Workers' Unity – Fourth International.

Ideology 
LI is a republican organization that supports the self-determination for the peoples of Spain and is a full member of the Trotskyist  International Workers' Unity – Fourth International.

History 
LI was born of a split of the Revolutionary Workers' Party in 1999, mainly by members of the city of Barcelona.

In the Catalan elections of 2010 LI supported Des de Baix, along with Anticapitalist Left, In Struggle and Corriente Roja, failing to gain any seat.

References

External links 
 LI web site (in Spanish)

Communist parties in Spain
Far-left politics in Spain
International Workers' Unity – Fourth International
Trotskyist organisations in Spain